Kerris Dorsey (born January 9, 1998) is an American actress and singer. She is known for her roles as Paige Whedon in the television series Brothers & Sisters, Casey Beane, Billy Beane's daughter, in the 2011 film Moneyball, and as Emily Cooper in the 2014 film Alexander and the Terrible, Horrible, No Good, Very Bad Day. Dorsey also portrayed Bridget Donovan, the daughter of the title character, in the television series Ray Donovan.

Career
In Moneyball, she performs a cover of Lenka's song "The Show", which is included on the soundtrack to the film.

In 2012, Dorsey guest starred on the Disney Channel series Shake it Up. 

Dorsey has also appeared in the films Walk the Line and Just Like Heaven. She played a supporting role in the American Girl film McKenna Shoots For the Stars as McKenna Brooks's reading tutor, Josie.

Dorsey guest starred as Molly in one episode in Don't Trust the B---- in Apartment 23, and had a small role in Sons of Anarchy as Ellie Winston. In 2012, she gained a supporting role as Sadie in the Disney Channel Original Movie Girl vs. Monster. Dorsey starred as Bridget Donovan on the Showtime crime drama series Ray Donovan.

Filmography

References

External links
 

1998 births
Living people
21st-century American actresses
Actresses from Los Angeles
American child actresses
American film actresses
American television actresses